Cryptastichus sabo is a species of Afrotropical chalcid wasp from the family Eulophidae. It is the only member of the monotypic genus Cryptastichus. It is a parasitoid of the citrus leafminer (Phyllocnistis citrella).

References

Eulophidae